Violin and Playing Cards on a Table is an early 20th century painting by Spanish cubist Juan Gris. Done in oil on canvas, the work is in the collection of the Metropolitan Museum of Art in New York.

References 

1913 paintings
Paintings in the collection of the Metropolitan Museum of Art
Paintings by Juan Gris
Musical instruments in art